"Get Me Outta Here" is the fifth single from Australian rock band Jet's 2003 debut album, Get Born. The song was released as a 7-inch single in the United Kingdom on 27 December 2004, reaching number 37 on the UK Singles Chart.

Charts

References

2003 songs
2005 singles
Elektra Records singles
Jet (band) songs
Song recordings produced by Dave Sardy
Songs written by Cameron Muncey
Songs written by Nic Cester